For domestic calls (within the country), 0 must be dialled before the user number of another administrative unit. The prefix for international calls from Albania is 00 (e.g., for a United States number 00 1 ... should be dialled). Below is an explanation when dialling a number within the Tirana administrative unit:

      0 4 xxx xxxx    (from within the Tirana administrative unit)
      0 4 xxx xxxx    (from within Albania, but outside Tirana)
   +355 4 xxx xxxx    (from outside Albania)

History
Albania has the lowest rate of telephone use per capita in Europe with roughly 10 lines per 100 people as of 2008 ITU statistics. As a result, cellular phone use is very common throughout the country. The numbering plan has constantly evolved during the last 30 years. Tirana has passed to a seven digit plan as of 2008 from a four digit plan in the communist period by gradually adding one digit.

New Numbering Plan and Addition of Digit "2"
As of March 2008, a new numbering plan was introduced in an effort to improve the quality of the service and increase fixed phone use in Albania. The old plan stayed in effect in parallel to the new until 15 September 2008.

The new numbering plan introduces a new digit, represented by the number 2 that is put in front of local telephone numbers country-wide.
For example, to dial a Tirana number with the old plan, it would have looked like XXX XXX. With the new plan, the digit 2 is added to form 2XXX XXX. The old plan is defunct and not longer in operation.
In total, there are 8 digits for every phone number in the country.

Additionally, changes include the replacement of the Municipality of Laç's calling code with the new 53 code.

Numbering plan by Municipality (effective 15 September 2008)
This is a list of prior area codes within Albania, incorporated into the user number as of 1 January 2014. To call from one administrative unit to another one, the digit "0" still has to be dialled first, but there is no change when calling from outside Albania.

Mobile phone codes

Emergency numbers

External links

Albania
Telecommunications in Albania
Albania communications-related lists